Podraga is a village in the upper Vipava Valley in the Municipality of Vipava in the traditional Inner Carniola region of Slovenia. It is now generally regarded as part of the Slovenian Littoral.

The parish church in the settlement is dedicated to Saints Hermagoras and Fortunatus and belongs to the Koper Diocese.

References

External links

Podraga at Geopedia

Populated places in the Municipality of Vipava